
Year 286 BC was a year of the pre-Julian Roman calendar. At the time it was known as the Year of the Consulship of Corvus (or Potitus) and Paetus (or, less frequently, year 468 Ab urbe condita). The denomination 286 BC for this year has been used since the early medieval period, when the Anno Domini calendar era became the prevalent method in Europe for naming years.

Events 
 By place 
 Greece 
 As Demetrius Poliorcetes and his army are chased across Asia Minor to the Taurus Mountains by the armies of Lysimachus and Seleucus, in Greece his son Antigonus meets with success. Ptolemy's fleet is driven off and Athens surrenders to Antigonus.
 After allowing Pyrrhus of Epirus to remain in possession of Macedonia with the title of king, he is expelled by Lysimachus who declares himself its king in the place of Pyrrhus.

 Roman Republic 
 The new law, Lex Aquilia, is enacted. This is a Roman law which provides compensation to the owners of property injured as a result of someone's fault.

 China 
 General Sima Cuo of the State of Qin attacks the Henei area of the State of Wei. Wei responds by handing over the major city of Anyi.

Births 
 Antiochus II Theos, king of the Hellenistic Seleucid Kingdom from 261 BC (d. 246 BC)

Deaths

References